Nitro may refer to:

Chemistry
Nitrogen, a chemical element and a gas except at very low temperatures, with which many compounds are formed:
Nitro compound, an organic compound containing one or more nitro functional groups, -NO2
Nitroalkene, a functional group combining the functionality of an alkene and nitro group
Nitrocellulose, or cellulose nitrate, an extremely flammable chemical compound
Nitroglycerin, or glyceryl trinitrate, an explosive chemical compound
Nitromethane, a simple organic nitro compound with the formula 
Nitro fuel, a fuel containing nitromethane and methanol
Nitro engine, an engine powered with nitro fuel used in some radio-controlled model cars, aircraft etc.

People
Danny Lee Clark (born 1964), known as "Nitro" on the original American Gladiators television show
John Morrison (wrestler) (born 1979), professional wrestler formerly known as Johnny Nitro
Nitro (rapper) (born 1993), Italian rapper
Nitro (wrestler) (born 1966), Mexican professional wrestler

Places
Giant, Richmond, California, formerly named Nitro
Nitro, West Virginia, United States

Arts and entertainment
Nitro (Adlabs Imagica), a roller coaster at the Imagicaa theme park in Khopoli, India
Nitro (film), a Canadian action film released in 2007
Nitro (Six Flags Great Adventure), a mega roller coaster at Six Flags Great Adventure in Jackson Township, New Jersey, United States

Fictional characters
Nitro (comics), a Marvel Comics supervillain
Nitro Norimaki, a character from the Dr. Slump franchise
Nitro, a character in the children's show The Shak played by Beau Walker

Music
Nitro (band), an 80s metal band
"Nitro (Youth Energy)", a song by The Offspring from the album Smash
Nitro Records, an independent punk music record label

Radio
WMMS-HD2, an HD Radio digital subchannel (100.7-2 FM) licensed to Cleveland, Ohio, United States, formerly branded Nitro

Television
Nitro (German TV channel), a German commercial television channel
Nitro (Spanish TV channel), a former Spanish commercial television channel owned by Atresmedia
"Nitro", an episode of Mission: Impossible
Nitro!, a game show hosted by Greg Lee
WCW Monday Nitro, a professional wrestling television program

Videogaming
Need for Speed: Nitro, a 2009 racing game
Nicktoons Nitro, a 2009 racing game for the Arcade
Nintendo DS, originally referred to by the codename "Project Nitro"
Nitro (video game), a 1990 computer game

Computing and technology
Nitro (wireless networking), an 802.11g performance enhancement technology
Nitro cyberattacks
Nitro, a marketing name given by Apple to JavaScriptCore, the JavaScript engine of WebKit
Nitro PDF, a commercial software application
Nitro, a paid membership on Discord

Medicine
Glyceryl trinitrate (pharmacology), a medical compound used for the treatment of angina pectoris
Medical use of nitroglycerin, prescribed for some heart conditions
Nitrous oxide, "laughing gas", used in some dental procedures as an anaesthetic

Vehicles and transportation
Dodge Nitro, a compact SUV
USS Nitro, a ship
Windtech Nitro, a Spanish competition paraglider design

Other
Nitro cold brew coffee
Nitro Express, a series of cartridges used in large-bore hunting rifles

See also